Marie (Maria) Friberg (5 Jabnuary 1852 - 16 September 1934)  was a Swedish opera singer (alto) of the Royal Swedish Opera. She is known for her relationship to King Oscar II of Sweden, with whom she allegedly had two sons.

Biography
Maria Vilhelmina Friberg was born in the St. Nikolai parish of Stockholm, Sweden. In 1883, Friberg aroused attention in the press when she performed as the bride in "Lycko-Pers resa" by August Strindberg with the personal monogram of Oscar II in the bridal crown at Nya teatern in Stockholm. The paper Dagens Nyheter reported that Friberg was housed as the king's mistress with their two sons in a house owned by the monarch.

In 1891, she married the French noble Pascal d'Aubebard vicomte de Ferussac, who adopted her two sons. In 1893, she married Edvard Leman (1841–1922).

Sources
 Elgklou, Lars (1978). Bernadotte: historien - och historier - om en familj. Stockholm: Askild & Kärnekull. Libris 7589807. 
 Lagerqvist, Lars O. (1979). Bernadotternas drottningar. Stockholm: Bonnier. Libris 7145664. 

1852 births
Mistresses of Swedish royalty
1934 deaths
19th-century Swedish women opera singers
Operatic contraltos